In medieval Latin, a  (plural ) was a compilation of excerpts or sententia from other writings and is an offshoot of the commonplacing tradition. The word is from the Latin flos (flower) and legere (to gather): literally a gathering of flowers, or collection of fine extracts from the body of a larger work. It was adapted from the Greek anthologia (ἀνθολογία) "anthology", with the same etymological meaning.

Medieval usage
Medieval  were systematic collections of extracts taken mainly from the writings of the Church Fathers from early Christian authors, also pagan philosophers such as Aristotle, and sometimes classical writings. The purpose was to take passages that illustrated certain topics, doctrines or themes. After the medieval period, the term was extended to apply to any miscellany or compilation of literary or scientific character.

Flowers
The term  also applied literally to a treatise on flowers or medieval books that are dedicated to ornamental rather than the medicinal or widely useful plants covered by herbals. The emergence of botanical illustration as a genre of art dates back to the 15th century, when herbals (books describing the culinary and medicinal uses of plants) were printed containing illustrations of flowers. Modern  seek to record collections of plants, often now endangered, from within a particular garden or place.  are among the most lavish and expensive of books because of all the work required to produce them.

Usage
The word applies especially to:
 a collection of botanically accurate paintings of plants, done by botanical illustrators from life
a patristic anthology in Christian literature
 the title of a scholarly journal published annually by the Canadian Society of Medievalists / Société canadienne des médiévistes
the title of various literary anthologies, e.g., by Johannes Stobaeus
the title of certain collections of musical compositions, e.g., by Georg Muffat

Florilegium societies
 The Royal Botanic Gardens, Kew opened a new gallery in 2008 to display works of botanical illustration alongside pieces from the collection of Shirley Sherwood. The Shirley Sherwood Gallery was the first public gallery in the world dedicated to showing botanical art. Kew's archives contain 200,000 works of botanical art, including pieces by 18th and 19th century masters, along with works by contemporary artists.
 The Royal Botanic Gardens, Sydney formed a Florilegium Society to create a collection of paintings of the significant plants growing in the estates of the Royal Botanic Gardens & Domain Trust.
 The Friends of the Royal Botanic Gardens, Melbourne created in 2001 a florilegium of significant plants growing in the Gardens. This 21st century florilegium is held digitally and photographically, the original works are not kept.
 The Sheffield Botanical Gardens established a Florilegium Society which aims to produce an archive of botanical illustrations of the plants of Sheffield Botanical Gardens.

See also

Banks' Florilegium
Botanical illustration
Grandes Heures of Anne of Brittany
Highgrove Florilegium
List of florilegia and botanical codices

References

Latin words and phrases